Casorzo Monferrato is a comune (municipality) in the Province of Asti in the Italian region Piedmont, located about  east of Turin and about  northeast of Asti.

Casorzo borders the following municipalities: Altavilla Monferrato, Grana, Grazzano Badoglio, Montemagno, Olivola, Ottiglio, and Vignale Monferrato.

Prior to 2022 it was named Casorzo.

References

Cities and towns in Piedmont